The Canchanchara is an IBA official cocktail made with Cuban aguardiente, honey, and fresh lime juice.

See also
 List of cocktails

References

Cocktails with rum
Cocktails with lime juice